Henry Eliot is a British author.

Eliot's first book, Curiocity grew out of a 2009 six edition map-magazine of the same title. The Guardian said that " its delight in trivia is infectious". The Evening Standard called it "endlessly fascinating". The Times Literary Supplement noted its "fresh flashes of insight".

Eliot has produced two volumes on Penguin books, The Penguin Classics Book and The Penguin Modern Classics Book, particularly focusing on jacket design.

Publications
Curiocity, Particular, 2016 (with Matt Lloyd-Rose)
The Penguin Classics Book, 2019
The Penguin Modern Classics Book, 2021

References

Living people
British journalists
British non-fiction writers
Year of birth missing (living people)